Tompkins Township is a civil township of Jackson County in the U.S. state of Michigan. The population was 2,671 at the 2010 census.

Geography

Tompkins Township is in northwestern Jackson County and is bordered to the north by Ingham County. State highway M-50 crosses the township, leading southeast  to Jackson, the county seat, and northwest  to Eaton Rapids.  The Grand River crosses the northeastern portion of the township.

Demographics
As of the census of 2000, there were 2,758 people, 985 households, and 781 families residing in the township. The racial makeup of the township was 96.74% White, 0.51% African American, 0.18% Native American, 0.15% Asian, 0.80% from other races, and 1.63% from two or more races. Hispanic or Latino of any race were 1.34% of the population.

There were 985 households, out of which 38.6% had children under the age of 18 living with them, 67.0% were married couples living together, 7.6% had a female householder with no husband present, and 20.7% were non-families. 17.2% of all households were made up of individuals, and 6.6% had someone living alone who was 65 years of age or older.  The average household size was 2.79 and the average family size was 3.13.

In the township the population was spread out, with 28.9% under the age of 18, 6.4% from 18 to 24, 28.7% from 25 to 44, 25.2% from 45 to 64, and 10.8% who were 65 years of age or older.  The median age was 37 years. For every 100 females, there were 98.8 males.  For every 100 females age 18 and over, there were 99.0 males.

The median income for a household in the township was $43,203, and the median income for a family was $46,893. Males had a median income of $38,477 versus $22,411 for females. The per capita income for the township was $17,094.  About 5.0% of families and 6.8% of the population were below the poverty line, including 9.9% of those under age 18 and 9.4% of those age 65 or over.

References

External links
Tompkins Township official website

Townships in Jackson County, Michigan
Townships in Michigan
Populated places established in 1838
1838 establishments in Michigan